Greatham is a small village in the Horsham District of West Sussex, England.

History
The Domesday Book of 1086 records the place village as Gretham. The toponym is recorded as Gretheam in 1121 and Gruteham later in the 12th century. The first element in the name means "gravel"; the second is uncertain, and could mean either "village, estate, manor, homestead", "meadow, especially a flat, low-lying meadow on a stream", or "an enclosed plot, a close".

Greatham Bridge was built for Sir Henry Tregoz in the early 14th century. The iron section was built after floods had damaged the bridge in 1838. A skirmish took place near the bridge during the English Civil War.

Early in the First World War Greatham inspired John Drinkwater's poem Of Greatham (to those who live there), which was published in his anthology Swords and Plough-shares.

Parish church

The undedicated small rectangular Church of England parish church is similar to Wiggonholt parish church, with which it often shared a priest in the Middle Ages. The rectangular single-room church has rubble ironstone walls which have mostly lancet windows and are probably 12th century. There is a slate-hung bell turret at the western end. Inside are an unusual double decker pulpit and a 17th-century altar rail.

Notable people
Wilfrid Meynell (1852-1948), publisher and editor, dead in Greatham
Robert Rydon (born 1964), cricketer

References

Horsham District
Villages in West Sussex